Washington, D.C. has a number of different modes of transportation available for use. Commuters have a major influence on travel patterns, with only 28% of people employed in Washington, D.C. commuting from within the city, whereas 33.5% commute from the nearby Maryland suburbs, 22.7% from Northern Virginia, and the rest from Washington, D.C.,'s outlying suburbs.

Commuting 

Washington, D.C., has the second-highest percentage of public transit commuters in the United States, behind only New York City.

Commuters have a major influence on travel patterns in Washington, D.C. 671,678 people are employed in Washington, D.C., with only 28% commuting from within the city. 18.7% of people working in Washington, D.C., commute from Prince George's County, Maryland, and 14.8% from Montgomery County, Maryland. 13.2% come from Fairfax County, Virginia, 6% from Arlington County, Virginia, and 3.5% from Alexandria, Virginia. Smaller numbers of commuters come from the outer suburbs, including 2.4% from Anne Arundel County, Maryland, and 2.3% from Prince William County, Virginia, 1.6% from Charles County, Maryland, 1.3% from Howard County, Maryland, and 1% from Loudoun County, Virginia.  Of the 260,000 Washington, D.C. residents that were employed as of 2000, 24% commute to jobs in Montgomery, Prince George's, Fairfax, and Arlington Counties, as well as Alexandria. Of those that work in Washington, D.C., 44.8% drive alone to work, 21.2% take Metro, 14.4% carpool/slug, 8.8% use Metrobus, 4.5% walk to work, 2.7% travel by commuter rail, and 0.6% ride their bicycle to work. Of the households in Washington, D.C., 35.4% do not own a car.

Public transportation statistics
The average amount of time people spend commuting with public transit in Washington, for example, to and from work, on a weekday is 86 min. 31% of public transit riders ride for more than 2 hours every day. The average amount of time people wait at a stop or station for public transit is 19 min, while 34% of riders wait for over 20 minutes on average every day.

Streets and highways 

City streets in the District of Columbia are organized primarily in a grid-like fashion with its origin at the United States Capitol, with diagonal streets running across this grid, as well as circles—a plan laid out by Pierre L'Enfant and revised by Andrew Ellicott and Joseph Ellicott. The north–south roads are primarily named with numbers (i.e., 1st Street, 2nd Street, etc.), while the east–west roads are primarily named with letters (beginning with A Street) or, once letters are exhausted, are named alphabetically (Adams, Bryant, Channing, etc.) Intersecting this network of streets are diagonal avenues named after each of the fifty states. Within this grid, all streets are a part of one of the four quadrants of the city — Northeast (NE), Northwest (NW), Southeast (SE), and Southwest (SW) — all centered on the Capitol Building. All roads end with this suffix at the end of their title. For example, there is a 4th Street NE, 4th Street NW, 4th Street SE, and 4th Street SW.

Exceptions to this nomenclature include the names of the streets that line the National Mall. The north side of the mall is lined by Constitution Avenue, whereas the south side of the mall is lined by Independence Avenue. Both streets follow the NE, NW, SE, SW rule.

Major interstates running through the area include the Capital Beltway (I-495), I-66, I-95, I-395 (also called the Southwest/Southeast Freeway in D.C. or Shirley Highway in Virginia), I-295 (also called the Anacostia Freeway or Kenilworth Avenue), and I-270 (which does not reach D.C., terminating at I-495). Other major highways include the Whitehurst Freeway, in D.C., the George Washington Parkway in Virginia, the Rock Creek Parkway in D.C., the Suitland Parkway in D.C. and Maryland, US Route 50, the Clara Barton Parkway and the Baltimore-Washington Parkway in Maryland, and the Dulles Toll Road in Virginia. Portions of I-66 and I-95/I-395 in Virginia are HOV roads (only vehicles carrying multi-occupants or using hybrid energy are allowed during weekday rush hours).

Cars

Taxi 

As of 2015, Washington had over 6,200 registered taxis, making it the third-largest concentration of taxis in the United States, after New York City and Chicago. Regardless of company operating the taxi service, all taxis operating in the city share a uniform design, as mandated by the DC Taxicab Commission. The vehicles are red with a gray stripe along the side doors.

Car sharing 

In December 2001, Metro initiated a relationship with Flexcar, a private company which operates car sharing networks in several North American cities. A competitor, Zipcar, began service in the region and later merged with Flexcar on October 31, 2007. With this service, cars are parked at major Metrorail stations and other convenient locations in the metropolitan area and made available for rental on an hourly basis, with the goal of reducing car dependency and congestion, improving the environment, and increasing transit ridership.

In March 2012, Car2Go began offering service in D.C., initially providing 200 Smart cars for use everywhere within the District's city limits. The international car sharing company, which offers one-way rentals charged by the minute, increased their vehicle fleet to 400 in 2013. During its first year of operation, Car2Go paid the city more than $500,000 for rights to meter-free parking. The service has seen initial success; from September 2012 to July 2013, membership tripled to 26,000 users.

Parking 
There is heavy vehicle congestion from the large percentage of the population who chooses to drive. This results in very limited parking, especially in the downtown areas of the city. Corporations have made various attempts to solve the city's parking problem as a guinea pig location, but there has been little success. Parking restrictions are strictly enforced, and the complicated parking hours posted on signs can be confusing. Environmentalists question the free parking spaces given to thousands of Congressional employees, discouraging them from using public transportation.

Rail

Washington Metro 

The Washington area is served by the Washington Metro rapid transit system, operated by the Washington Metropolitan Area Transit Authority (WMATA). The Metro opened in 1976 and currently has 97 stations across six lines covering 129 miles (208 km) of track. When measured by ridership, the Washington Metro is the second-largest rapid rail system in the United States and fifth-largest in North America. Riders pay using a SmartTrip Card, and the fare is determined by distance traveled on the system as well as the time of day. Fares are more expensive the farther one's trip is, and are also more expensive during peak hours of the weekday. Many suburban Metro stations have large parking garages for commuters to park in. These garages are free during the weekend but require payment during the weekdays.

WMATA also operates Metrobus, a regional bus system serving D.C. and the closest immediate counties (described in greater detail below). The Washington Metro connects with both commuter rail and intercity rail systems at Union Station.

DC Streetcar 

On February 27, 2016, the first line of the DC Streetcar was opened between Union Station and Oklahoma Ave/Benning Rd, running for most of its length along H Street. More lines are planned.

Commuter rail 

MARC provides service from Union Station to Baltimore and Perryville with intermediate stops, on both the Camden and Penn Lines. MARC's Brunswick Line provides service between Martinsburg, West Virginia, with intermediate stops, and Union Station. A new spur of the Brunswick line also goes to Frederick, Maryland. All three lines of Maryland's MARC train system begin at Union Station in Washington where passengers can transfer to the Washington Metro's Red Line.

Virginia Railway Express (VRE) commuter trains provide service from Union Station to Fredericksburg and Manassas, Virginia, on its Fredericksburg and Manassas Lines, respectively.

Amtrak 

Amtrak's Acela Express and Northeast Regional provide service on the high speed Northeast Corridor from Washington's Union Station to Baltimore, Philadelphia, New York City, and Boston, as well as intermediate stops. In addition, the Vermonter provides service to St. Albans, Vermont, via New York. The Palmetto provides service to Georgia, the Crescent provides service to New Orleans, and Amtrak's Silver Service trains provide service to Florida, all en route from New York. The Capitol Limited and Cardinal, the latter using a much longer and more southerly route via West Virginia and Virginia, provide rail service between Washington, D.C., and Chicago. Amtrak's nonstop service Auto Train to Sanford, Florida, originates 30 minutes south of the city in Lorton, Virginia.

Airport transportation 
Metro's Yellow and Blue Lines serve Ronald Reagan Washington National Airport. The Silver Line station at Dulles International Airport opened in November 2022, connecting the Washington Metro system to the city's major international airport for the first time.

Bus

Metrobus 

Metrobus is a bus service operated by Metro, consisting of 176 bus lines serving 12,301 stops, including 3,133 bus shelters and nearly every Washington Metro station. In fiscal year 2006, Metrobus provided 131 million trips, 39% of all Washington Metro trips. It serves D.C. and the inner ring of suburban counties. Like the Washington Metrorail, the Metrobus is operated by WMATA and riders can pay with a SmarTrip Card. Overall, there are 269 bus routes serving 11,129 stops and 2,554 bus shelters across the city and inner suburbs.

The Metrobus runs the Richmond Highway Express, a limited-stop bus route between the King Street–Old Town station of the Yellow and Blue lines of the Washington Metro and Fort Belvoir. The route runs along U.S. Route 1 in Fairfax County, Virginia. Additionally, Metrobus runs the Metroway bus rapid transit line in Arlington, Virginia, and Alexandria, Virginia.

DC Circulator 

DC Circulator is a downtown circulator bus system owned by the District of Columbia Department of Transportation, with routes connecting points of interest in the city center. The DC Circulator includes 139 stops across 6 lines (with a 7th coming seasonally). The DC Circulator only costs $1.00 to ride, and takes passengers through central Washington, especially along the tourist-dense locations of the National Mall and surrounding area.

Charter and commuter buses 
Washington, D.C., has many charter and commuter buses that carry people to and from the city, sometimes at great distances. Union Station is a stop for many intercity and charter bus lines, including Megabus, BoltBus, Greyhound Lines, OurBus, Peter Pan Bus Lines, and BestBus. A bus stop for the Chinatown bus lines is near  station and the Capitol One Arena. The  Metro station also has a bus line that commutes to the Baltimore-Washington International Airport, which connects Metro to the Baltimore area's MTA buses and light rail system. MTA Commuter Bus also serves limited parts of Montgomery and Prince George's Counties in Maryland. Local transit services such as Loudoun County Commuter Bus and private companies such as Martz Group provide commuter bus service to Virginia.

The Maryland Department of Transportation and several privately operated companies provide bus service during weekday rush hours between D.C. and more distant counties such as Anne Arundel, Calvert, Charles, Frederick, Howard, and St. Mary's in Maryland; and Fredericksburg, Loudoun, Prince William, and Stafford in Virginia.

OurBus offers intercity bus service to New York City, Philadelphia, Allentown, Binghamton, and Ithaca from Union Station. The company also serves the DC suburbs including Tysons, Rockville, Bethesda, and Columbia with direct service to New York City.

Tripper Bus is a private commuter bus offering service from the Washington, D.C., suburbs of Arlington, Virginia and Bethesda, Maryland to and from New York City.

Vamoose Bus is a private bus line offering service from the Washington, D.C., suburbs of Lorton, Virginia, Arlington, Virginia and Bethesda, Maryland to and from New York City.

Washington Deluxe is an independent bus line offering express round trip service between New York and Washington, D.C. The Washington, D.C., bus stops include Dupont Circle and Columbus Circle. The New York City stops include Penn Station, Chinatown, and Brooklyn.

Higher education campuses in the area offer on-site and commuter transportation, such as the University of Maryland's Shuttle-UM.

Ally Charter Bus is a private group transportation service that offers charter bus and minibus rentals in Washington, D.C., Virginia, Maryland and New York City.

Air 

Washington, D.C., is served by three major airports: two are located in suburban Virginia and one in Maryland.

Ronald Reagan Washington National Airport  is the closest—located in Arlington County, Virginia, just across the Potomac River from Hains Point, and accessible via Washington Metro. The airport is conveniently located near the downtown area; however, it has somewhat restricted flights to airports within the United States because of noise and security concerns.

Dulles is the second busiest international gateway on the Eastern Seaboard. It is the Washington region's second busiest airport in terms of passengers served. Dulles offers service from several low-cost carriers, including JetBlue. However, the low-cost selection decreased greatly when Independence Air (which was headquartered at Dulles) folded in January 2006.

BWI is notable for its variety of low-cost carriers, such as Southwest Airlines, and its few international flights, on carriers such as Air Canada and British Airways.

Reagan National Airport and Dulles International Airport are operated by the Metropolitan Washington Airports Authority.

General aviation is additionally available at several smaller airfields, including Montgomery County Airpark (Gaithersburg, Maryland), College Park Airport (College Park, Maryland), Potomac Airfield (Friendly CDP of Prince George's County, Maryland), and Manassas Regional Airport (Manassas, Virginia). 

Since 2003, the general aviation airports closest to Washington, D.C., have had their access strictly limited by the implementation of the Air Defense Identification Zone (ADIZ). The city itself has very severe flight restrictions, and all flights entering the air space around the city must receive special air traffic approval before doing so.

Bicycle and scooter

There is a network of  dedicated bicycle lanes around Washington, D.C., and there are 1,300 bicycle racks installed on sidewalks all over the city. An estimated 3.3% of the District's residents biked to work at least one day during 2010, and by 2008 the city had the sixth-highest percentage of bike commuters in the United States.

The city's primary bicycle sharing system is Capital Bikeshare, which began services in September 2010. Washington, D.C., formerly had the largest bike sharing service in the U.S. with 1,100 bicycles and 110 rental locations (New York City's CitiBike program is now larger). The city began a dockless bikeshare pilot program in fall 2017, and more recently introduced dockless electric scooters. The Washington Area Bicyclist Association (WABA) provides advice and information to bicycle commuters, as well as lobbying for better cycling conditions.

See also 
 List of heliports in Washington, D.C.
 Plug-in electric vehicles in Washington, D.C.
 Transportation in Northern Virginia
 Transportation in Maryland

References 

 
Washington, D.C.